Christopher Duenas (born in Tamuning, Guam) is an Olympic and national record holding swimmer from Guam. He has swum for Guam at the:
Olympics: 2008, 2012
World Championships: 2007, 2009, 2011
Short Course Worlds: 2012

Early life and education 
Christopher Duenas started swimming when he was six years old.

Olympic career 

At the 2008 Olympics, he competed in the 100 m freestyle, finishing in 59th place.

At the 2012 Summer Olympics, he competed in the Men's 100 metre freestyle, finishing in 44th place overall in the heats, failing to qualify for the semifinals.

International career 

Duenas won a bronze medal at the 2007 Pacific Games in the 100 meter freestyle. He won a gold medal at the 2014 Micronesian Games in the 100 m butterfly. He also won a gold in the 200 medley relay.  He set the national record in the 50 m freestyle at the 5th East Asian Games.  He was part of the Guam team that set a new national record in the 4 x 100 m freestyle and 4 x 200 m freestyle at the 15th Pacific Games.

References

External links
 

Guamanian male freestyle swimmers
Year of birth missing (living people)
Living people
Olympic swimmers of Guam
Swimmers at the 2008 Summer Olympics
Swimmers at the 2012 Summer Olympics
People from Tamuning, Guam